These are the full results of the 2018 South American Under-23 Championships in Athletics which took place between September 29 and 30 at Pista de Atletismo Jefferson Pérez in Cuenca, Ecuador.

Men's results

100 meters

Heats – September 29Wind:Heat 1: +0.3 m/s, Heat 2: +0.6 m/s

Final – September 29Wind:+0.3 m/s

200 meters

Heats – September 30Wind:Heat 1: +1.1 m/s, Heat 2: 0.0 m/s

Final – September 30Wind:-1.9 m/s

400 meters
September 29

800 meters
September 30

1500 meters
September 29

5000 meters
September 30

10,000 meters
September 29

110 meters hurdles
September 29Wind: +1.2 m/s

400 meters hurdles
September 30

3000 meters steeplechase
September 30

4 × 100 meters relay
September 29

4 × 400 meters relay
September 30

20,000 meters walk
September 29

High jump
September 29

Pole vault
September 30

Long jump
September 29

Triple jump
September 30

Shot put
September 29

Discus throw
September 30

Hammer throw
September 29

Javelin throw
September 30

Decathlon
September 29–30

Women's results

100 meters

Heats – September 29Wind:Heat 1: +0.6 m/s, Heat 2: -0.2 m/s

Final – September 29Wind:+1.0 m/s

200 meters

Heats – September 30Wind:Heat 1: +0.5 m/s, Heat 2: +1.6 m/s

Final – September 30Wind:-0.1 m/s

400 meters
September 29

800 meters
September 30

1500 meters
September 29

5000 meters
September 30

10,000 meters
September 29

100 meters hurdles
September 29Wind: -1.4 m/s

400 meters hurdles
September 30

3000 meters steeplechase
September 30

4 × 100 meters relay
September 29

4 × 400 meters relay
September 30

20,000 meters walk
September 29

High jump
September 30

Pole vault
September 29

Long jump
September 30

Triple jump
September 29

Shot put
September 30

Discus throw
September 29

Hammer throw
September 30

Javelin throw
September 29

Heptathlon
September 29–30

References

South American Championships
Events at the South American Under-23 Championships in Athletics